The 1990 season in Swedish football, starting January 1990 and ending December 1990:

Honours

Official titles

Competitions

Promotions, relegations and qualifications

Promotions

League transfers

Relegations

International qualifications

Domestic results

Allsvenskan 1990

Allsvenskan play-off 1990 
Semi-finals

Final

Allsvenskan promotion play-off 1990

Division 1 Norra 1990

Division 1 Södra 1990

Division 1 promotion play-off 1990

Svenska Cupen 1989–90 
Final

National team results

Notes

References 
Print

Online

 
Seasons in Swedish football